Yanzigitovo (Yänyeget) is a rural locality (a village) in Tatlybayevsky Selsoviet, Baymaksky District, Bashkortostan, Russia. The population was 362 as of 2010. There are 7 streets.

Geography 
Yanzigitovo is located 30 km east of Baymak (the district's administrative centre) by road. Khasanovo is the nearest rural locality.

References 

Rural localities in Baymaksky District